African Swimming Championships are the African championships in the sport of Swimming. It is organised by the African Swimming Confederation (CANA) and held biennially. 

The most recent edition of the Championships was held in August 2022 in Tunis.

Championships

All-time medal table (2006-2022)

Championships records

See also
 African Junior Swimming Championships
 African Masters Aquatics Championships
 Swimming at the African Games

References

External links 
African Swimming Confederation

 
International swimming competitions
Recurring sporting events established in 1974